Crassispira berthelini is an extinct species of sea snail, a marine gastropod mollusk in the family Pseudomelatomidae, the turrids and allies.

Distribution
Fossils have been found in Eocene strata in Ile-de-France, France.

References

 de Boury, E., 1899. Révision des pleurotomes éocènes du Bassin de Paris. La Feuille des Jeunes Naturalistes 29: 117–163, sér. 3° série
 Cossmann (M.) & Pissarro (G.), 1913 Iconographie complète des coquilles fossiles de l'Éocène des environs de Paris, t. 2, p. pl. 46–65

External links
   Cossmann (M.), 1901 Catalogue illustré des coquilles fossiles de l'Éocène des environs de Paris (3ème appendice). Annales de la Société royale Malacologique de Belgique, t. 36, p. 9-110

berthelini
Gastropods described in 1899